Stará Huta is a village and municipality in Detva District, in the Banská Bystrica Region of central Slovakia.

External links
http://www.statistics.sk/mosmis/eng/run.html

Villages and municipalities in Detva District